Thomas Lanigan-Schmidt (born 1948) is an American artist who took part in the Stonewall riots.

History
Lanigan-Schmidt's artwork incorporates materials such as tinsel, foil, cellophane, saran wrap and glitter, embracing kitsch and intentionally tacky. 
His work has been compared to that of Florine Stettheimer, who used cellophane in her sets for the Gertrude Stein/Virgil Thomson opera Four Saints in Three Acts; his art was included in an exhibit of artists influenced by Stettheimer.
His work has also been likened to the religious-themed tinfoil-covered thrones of art brut artist James Hampton.
He is sometimes grouped with the Pattern and Decoration art movement, though he says that is "retrospective craziness".
His art is noted for its incorporation of Catholic iconography.

Joe Brainard is also cited as a forerunner with his use of decorative collage and queer and religious themes.

Lanigan-Schmidt attended Pratt Institute in 1965-66, was rejected by Cooper Union, and attended School of Visual Arts.

Lanigan-Schmidt began by exhibiting his art in his own apartment; an early major exhibit in 1969 was titled The Sacristy of the Hamptons. 
Another home exhibit was titled The Summer Palace of Czarina Tatlina.
In these early home exhibits, and also in at least one later recreation of an early exhibit, he guided visitors through the exhibit in drag in character as art collector Ethel Dull.

While Lanigan Schmidt's art is not widely known, he has received critical acclaim.

He has been referenced as an antecedent to Jeff Koons in the intentional use of kitsch in art.

Lanigan-Schmidt's work has been included in major art museum survey exhibits. His art was in the 1984 Venice Biennale, and his trip there inspired his 1985 Venetian Glass Series.  His foil rats and drag queens produced in the 1970s were included in the 1995 exhibit  "In A Different Light" at the Berkeley Art Museum, which was curated by Lawrence Rinder and Nayland Blake. 
His art was included in the 1991 Whitney Biennial as well as the Whitney Museum's survey of 20th-century art, "The American century: art & culture 1900-2000."

Lanigan-Schmidt was an associate of the underground filmmaker Jack Smith. He participated in at least one of Smith's performances, "Withdrawal from Orchid Lagoon". 
He was interviewed in the documentary Jack Smith and the Destruction of Atlantis.
Another member of Lanigan-Schmidt's circle was Charles Ludlam.

Lanigan-Schmidt, who is openly gay was present at the Stonewall riots, a seminal moment in gay history, and is one of the few recognized veterans still living.
Shortly after the riot started, he was photographed with a group of other young people by photographer Fred W. McDarrah.
Lanigan-Schmidt appears in the film Stonewall in a documentary segment.
An installation art piece by Lanigan-Schmidt, Mother Stonewall and the Golden Rats commemorated the events at the Stonewall Inn.
In recognition of the 40th anniversary of the Stonewall riots, Lanigan-Schmidt was among those invited to the White House to meet with Michelle and Barack Obama.

He is on the faculty of the School of Visual Arts

Lanigan-Schmidt worked as a 1960s Linden youth doing "odd jobs to help support his family and was bullied by high school thugs," moving to New York City as a young man.  As a child in 1950s Linden, after Lanigan-Schmidt was assigned to decorate the school bulletin board in his Catholic elementary school, he built a detailed model of a church altar.  The impressive model was featured in a local paper while Lanigan-Schmidt was a student at St. Elizabeth School at 170 Hussa Street.  The school closed in 2014; it is a part of the campus of St. Elizabeth of Hungary Roman Catholic Church in Linden.

From November 18, 2012 to April 7, 2013, Lanigan-Schmidt's art was the subject of a retrospective at MoMA PS1.

Exhibitions
"Pattern, Crime & Decoration", thematic exhibition at Le Consortium, France, Dijon, 2019.
"Tenemental (With Sighs Too Deep for Words)", Howl, New York, New York, November 16-December 19, 2018
"Ecce Homo: Thomas Lanigan-Schmit and the Art of Rebellion", Pavel Zoubok, June 6-August 9, 2013
"Thomas Lanigan-Schmidt: Tender Love Among the Junk," MoMA PS1, October 2012- April 2013
 "The True Praxis of Dotty Page, Willy Nilly & the Book of Roof, Read Daily by Savant in the Cathedral of  St. Anamnesis, & the Sacred Dentures of Emma Street," The Front Room, Contemporary Art Museum St. Louis, 2010
 "Tenement Symphony," Pavel Zoubok, September 10-October 10, 2009
 "Placemats and Potholders (Memory & Desire)," Pavel Zoubok, 2006
 "Collage: Signs and Surfaces," Pavel Zoubok, 2005
 "Stapled to the Soul," Pavel Zoubok, 2005
 "The American Century: Art & Culture 1900-2000", Whitney Museum, 1999
 "Hidden Treasures," Holly Solomon Gallery, 1999
 "Love Flight of a Pink Candy Heart," Holly Solomon Gallery, 1996
 "In a Different Light," Berkeley Art Museum, 1995
 "Byzantine Neo-Platonic Rectangles," Holly Solomon Gallery, 1994
 "1969: A Year Revisited," New York University's Grey Art Gallery, 1994
 "The Summer Palace of Czarina Tatlina, 1969-70, a reconstruction," Holly Solomon Gallery, 1992
 Whitney Biennial, 1991
 "The Center Show," Lesbian and Gay Community Services Center, 1989
 "Halfway to Paradise," Holly Solomon Gallery, 1988
 "A Theology of Glitter: An Aesthetic of Poverty", Walters Art Gallery, Baltimore, MD, 1986 
 "Venetian Glass Series," Holly Solomon Gallery, 1985
 Venice Biennale, 1984
"The Preying Hands", Holly Solomon Gallery, New York, NY, 1983
"New York Now", Kestner-Gesellschaft, Hannover, 1982 
 "Religion Into Art", Pratt Manhattan Center, 1981
"Grace and Original Sin: Saints and Sinners," Holly Solomon Gallery, New York, NY, 1980
 "10 artists/artists space," Neuberger Museum, SUNY Purchase, 1979
 "Iconostasis", Holly Solomon Gallery, 1978
"Thomas Lanigan Schmidt, James Biederman, Charles Simonds", Artists Space, December 7–28, 1974
"The Summer Palace of Czarina Tatlina", 266 E. 4th Street, 1969-1970
"The Sacristy of the Hamptons", 266 E. 4th Street, 1969

References

1948 births
Living people
People from Linden, New Jersey
Artists from Elizabeth, New Jersey
Artists from New York City
American gay artists
LGBT people from New Jersey
Pratt Institute faculty